The Landtag of Saxony-Anhalt is the parliament of the German federal state Saxony-Anhalt. It convenes in Magdeburg and currently consists of 97 members of six parties. The current majority is a coalition of the Social Democratic Party, Free Democratic Party  and the Christian Democratic Union, supporting the cabinet of Minister-President Reiner Haseloff.

Current composition
After the elections of June 6, 2021, the composition of the Landtag is as follows:

Elections are conducted using a proportional representation system, with a minimum of 5% vote share to receive any seats.

Historical Composition

Presidents of the Landtag

See also
2002 Saxony-Anhalt state election
2006 Saxony-Anhalt state election
2011 Saxony-Anhalt state election
2016 Saxony-Anhalt state election

External links
 Official Website

Saxony-Anhalt
Landtag of Saxony-Anhalt